Kabba is a city in Kogi State in mid west Nigeria. It lies near the Osse River, at the intersection of roads from Lokoja, Okene, Ogidi, Ado-Ekiti, and Egbe. The town is about 295 kilometers away from Abuja. It is 511 kilometers from Lagos.

Archbishop John Olorunfemi Onaiyekan, of the Roman Catholic Archdiocese of Abuja, based in Abuja, Nigeria, was born there, according to his Wikipedia article.

Description
Kabba was the administrative headquarters of the Kabba province of the defunct Northern Region of Nigeria, which includes all of the current Kogi State. Kabba is a trade centre for coffee, cocoa, yams, cassava, maize, sorghum, shea nuts, peanuts (groundnuts), beans, cotton, and woven cloth produced by the Yoruba, Ebira, and other peoples of the surrounding area.

Kabba people speak a dialect of the Yoruba Language called Owe.

Kabba is the headquarters of the Kabba/Bunnu local government area of Kogi state and the current Chairman of Kabba/Bunu Local Government is Hon.E. O. Olorunleke Moses. Kabba has a tripodal traditional leadership called: Obaro, Obadofin and Obajemu, with the Obaro who is also the chairman of the Okun traditional council as head.
The present Obaro is Oba Solomon Owoniyi (Obaro Oweyomade 1) who took over in 2018 after the demise of Oba Michael Olobayo (Obaro Ero Il). His palace is located at Odo-Aofin. Other notable settlements in Kabba include Aiyeteju, Odi-olowo, Kajola, Odo-ero, Odolu, Fehinti, Surulere, other settlements refer to as Ikowaopa includes Iyah, Otu, Egbeda, Gbeleko, Okedayo, Kakun, Ohakiti, Obele, Ogbagba, Ayonghon, Ayedun, Ayetoro Egunbe of Obangogo, Iduge, Adesua, Asanta, Korede, Okekoko, Katu, Apanga and others.

Kabba kingdom is divided into three major communities with a total of 14 clans:
 Kabba – 6 clans.
 Katu  – 3 clans.
 Odolu – 5 clans.

Secondary Schools in Kabba include Government Science School Okedayo, Federal Government Girls College, Saint Augustine's College, Saint Barnabas Secondary School, Saint Monica's College, Sacred Heart College Iyah – Kabba, Bishop McCalla Secondary School, Local Government Comprehensive High School, Christ Secondary School, Oloruntobi Group of Schools, Green Valley Grammar School, Local Government Secondary School Kakun, Aunty Fola Excel School, Wise Virgin Secondary School, Local Government school Otu-Egunbe, Kogi State College Of Education Technical Egbeda, and College of Agriculture, a division of Agricultural Colleges Ahmadu Bello University Zaria.
 
Also in Kabba is the ancient Sacred Heart Catholic church which has produced numerous priests in Nigeria and across the globe including the Archbishop John Olorunfemi Onaiyekan.

Kabba is the present headquarters of Kogi Western senatorial district and also the headquarters of Kabba-Bunu-Ijumu Federal Constituency.

Notable people
 
 
 
 Prof. Etannibi Alemika, Iluke Bunu 
 Prof. Joseph Abiodun Balogun, Isanlu
 Prof. Abubakar Musa, Mopa 
 Archbishop John Onaiyekan, Abuja, Nigeria.

References

Populated places in Kogi State
Towns in Yorubaland
Towns in Nigeria